Tetra-tert-butylethylene is a hypothetical organic compound, a hydrocarbon with formula C18H36, or ((H3C−)3C−)2C=C(−C(−CH3)3)2.  As the name indicates, its molecular structure can be viewed as an ethylene molecule H2C=CH2 with the four hydrogens replaced by tert-butyl −C(−CH3)3 groups.

As of 2006, this compound had not yet been synthesized, in spite of many efforts. It is of interest in chemical research as an alkene whose double bond is strained but protected by steric hindrance.

See also
 Tetra-tert-butylmethane, C17H36, another "impossible" hydrocarbon
 C18H36

References

Hydrocarbons
Alkenes
Hypothetical chemical compounds
Tert-butyl compounds